In 1150, Serbian Grand Prince Uroš II, a Hungarian ally, summoned an army led by Grdeša, the župan (count) of Travunia, and Vučina, against the Byzantine Empire. The Byzantines won the battle, capturing both Grdeša and Vučina. Uroš II was removed from the throne, and replaced by his brother Desa, who had up until then served as the Prince of Zahumlje. It is assumed that the prisoners were taken to Sredets (modern Sofia), but were released by 1151, when a "Grd" is mentioned as a witness of Desa's charter to the Monastery of St. Mary on Mljet.

References

Sources

R. Novaković, Još nešto povodom bitke na Tari

Byzantine–Serbian battles
Conflicts in 1150
12th century in Serbia
1150 in Europe
1150s in the Byzantine Empire
Grand Principality of Serbia